20th Acrobatic Gymnastics World Championships were held in Coimbra, Portugal from June 14 to June 17, 2006.
This was the first time the competition was called "Acrobatic Gymnastics World Championships", after previously being called "World Sports Acrobatics Championships".

Results

Men's Group

Men's Pair

Mixed Pair

Women's Group

Women's Pair

References
FIG official site

Acrobatic Gymnastics World Championships
Acrobatic Gymnastics World Championships
2006 in Portuguese sport
International gymnastics competitions hosted by Portugal